Weeping willow is an ornamental tree (Salix babylonica and related hybrids)

Weeping willow or Weeping Willows may also refer to:

Art
Weeping Willow, a 1918 painting by Claude Monet

Persons
Grand Duke George Alexandrovich of Russia or Weeping Willow (1871–1899)

Film and television
Weeping Willow (film), a 2014 animated short film
"Weeping Willow" (Law & Order: Criminal Intent), an episode of Law & Order: Criminal Intent
"Weeping Willows" (CSI), an episode of CSI

Music
Weeping Willows, a Swedish pop rock group
"Weeping Willow" (Joplin), a piano rag by Scott Joplin
"Weeping Willow" (song), a song by The Verve from Urban Hymns
"Weeping Willow", a song by Sébastien Schuller
"The Weeping Willow", an alternate name for the folk song "Bury Me Beneath the Willow"